Wang Shasha may refer to:

Wang Shasha (goalball) (born 1986), Chinese goalball player
Wang Shasha (handballer) (born 1987), Chinese handballer
Wang Shasha (Tân Bao Thanh Thiên 2010) Ải Hổ, Ải Ngọc Hà